Gan Rui (born 11 January 1985 in Chongqing) is a Chinese football player who currently plays as a midfielder for Chengdu Rongcheng.

Club career
In 2005, Gan Rui started his professional footballer career with Chongqing Lifan in the Chinese Super League. He would eventually make his league debut for Chongqing on 11 March  2006 in a game against Liaoning Whowin, which ended in a 2-1 victory. Unfortunately by the end of the season he was part of the team that was relegated at the end of the season. He would remain with the club as they eventually gained promotion back into the top tier at the end of the 2008 campaign.  

On 26 February 2015, Gan transferred to China League Two side Nanjing Qianbao. On 8 January 2016 the club relocated to the city of Chengdu and he would move with them as they renamed themselves Chengdu Qbao. Chengdu Qbao withdrew from League Two in 2018 when the Qbao Group was under investigation with illegal fund raising. On 20 March 2018, a phoenix club was formed by Chengdu Better City Investment Group Co., Ltd. and Gan would join them as they participated in the 2018 Chinese Champions League.
He would go on to win promotion with the club as they came runners-up at the end of the 2019 China League Two season. He would captain the team as he aided them to a meteoric rise through the divisions as the club gained promotion to the top tier at the end of the 2021 league campaign.

Career statistics 

Statistics accurate as of match played 8 January 2023.

Honours

Club
Chongqing Lifan
China League One: 2014

References

External links
 

1985 births
Living people
Chinese footballers
Footballers from Chongqing
Chongqing Liangjiang Athletic F.C. players
Chengdu Better City F.C. players
Chinese Super League players
China League One players
China League Two players
Association football midfielders